Alon Shtruzman is an Israeli media executive and television producer. He is CEO of Keshet International, Keshet Media Group's global distribution and production arm. He is one of the founders of Israel’s multi-channel industry, commissioned thousands of hours of programming, including the original "In Treatment" (BeTipul) and introduced Israel’s initial video on demand (VOD) service. Shtruzman was featured in Variety’s "Dealmakers Impact Report" for rolling out Keshet International and setting production outposts in the UK, US and Australia.

Career
In 1991 Alon Shtruzman joined ICP (Israel Cable Programming), the company formed by the Israeli local cable companies to jointly produce original channels.  In 1992 he was appointed to creative director, in charge for original production and on-air promo . Within ICP, he was one of the drivers behind The Children Channel (Arutz HaYeladim), Israel's first kids television network. In 1995 Shtruzman joined the founding team of Israel's first independent channel producer, Noga Communication.

In 2000, shtruzman founded Zoe Interactive,  where he served as the company's first CEO.
In 2002, he became VP of Content at Zoe's mother company, Ananey Group, where he launched a bouquet of digital channels including Nickelodeon Israel. 
 
In 2004, he became managing director of ICP where he introduced Israel's pioneering Video on demand service and was responsible for the commissioning and production of TV shows and films including "Someone to Run With", "The Arbitrator" and "In Treatment". 
During the merge of the regional cable operators, Shtruzman led the consolidation of ICP into the unified company and became the first vice president of content for Hot (Israel). 
In 2007, he joined News Corp's Fox International Channels and National Geographic Channels as Vice President of Digital, based in Rome and then London.

In 2009 Shtruzman became COO and president of media for cloud gaming pioneer Playcast Media Systems which was later sold to video-game rental service Gamefly.

In 2012 Shtruzman joined Keshet Media Group and launched Keshet International which produces and distributes shows such as Deal With It, Rising Star, Master Class, Dig, Dear Neighbours, Prisoners of War and Boom. In the U.S. he was executive producer for Dig, Rising Star and Boom.  In 2014, Shtruzman moved with his family from London to Los Angeles to launch Keshet Studios as Keshet International's Hollywood production arm.

In 2016, Shtruzman founded Stardom Ventures, a venture capital fund, which raised 65 million USD for investment in tech start-ups in 2021. In 2018, Shtruzman expanded Keshet International's production footprint in the US, Germany and the UK including the acquisition of production companies Tresor and Greenbird Media Group.

Film & Television

See also
Avi Nir
 IMDB

References

Chief operating officers
Living people
Year of birth missing (living people)
Businesspeople from Los Angeles
Place of birth missing (living people)
Israeli chief executives
Israeli Jews